Corentin is a name of Breton origin. It is the name of a saint, Corentin of Quimper. It can also refer to:

People
Corentin Tolisso, French midfielder
Corentin Corre, Breton cyclist 
Corentin Louis Kervran, Breton scientist 
Paul Féval, père (Paul Henri Corentin Féval)
Corentin Moutet, French tennis player

Places
St. Corentin's Cathedral, Quimper
Corentin Celton (Paris Métro)
Corentin Cariou (Paris Métro)

Other
Corentin (comics), a series of comic books by Paul Cuvelier.

Breton masculine given names